St. James Episcopal Church (also known as St. James the Apostle Episcopal Church) is a historic church at 210 E. Third Street in Coquille, Oregon. The parish is a member of the Episcopal Church (United States), and part of the worldwide Anglican Communion.

It was built in 1897 and added to the National Register of Historic Places in 1992.

The current vicar is Father Timothy Hannon, who began serving the people of Coquille in July, 2018.

References

Episcopal churches in Oregon
Churches on the National Register of Historic Places in Oregon
Carpenter Gothic church buildings in Oregon
Churches completed in 1897
Buildings and structures in Coos County, Oregon
National Register of Historic Places in Coos County, Oregon
1897 establishments in Oregon
19th-century Episcopal church buildings